The Yong'an Temple at Mailiao Township, Yunlin County, Taiwan is a temple dedicated to the deity Kai Zhang Sheng Wang (開漳聖王), who his followers refer to as the "Sacred Duke, Founder of Zhangzhou City".

History
The groundbreaking for the temple was on 18 August 1991. Most of the structure was completed within a year. The original temple name was the "Yongji temple". It was later renamed the "Yongan temple".

Worship
Kai Zhang Sheng Wang
Wu Xiao Kuan
San Tai Zi
Tu Di Gong
Songzi Niangniang
Tiger God

Cultural activities
Chen Yuanguang's birthday: October 3 (on the Chinese calendar)

References
Yangcho Community●Culture and industry

1991 establishments in Taiwan
Religious buildings and structures completed in 1991
Temples in Yunlin County
Taoist temples in Taiwan